There are six middle schools in Arlington County, Virginia, administered by Arlington Public Schools.

Dorothy Hamm Middle School
Dorothy Hamm Middle School is located at 4100 Vacation Lane. The principal is Ellen Smith. The school is named after civil rights activist Dorothy Hamm. From 1951 to 1978, this building was the location of Stratford Junior High School. From 1978  to 2019, the H-B Woodlawn Secondary Program was located here, along with the former Stratford Program (now the Eunice Kennedy Shriver Program). Dorothy Hamm was first opened for the 2019–2020 school year. Students graduating Dorothy Hamm will either attend W-L or Yorktown High Schools.

Gunston Middle School

Gunston Middle School is located at 2700 South Lang Street, in Arlington Ridge. The principal is Dr. Lori Wiggins. In 2012–13, there were over 800 students enrolled and more than 80 teachers (41 of whom have their Master's Degree). It is accredited through the Southern Association of Colleges and Schools. The school was originally called Brandon Junior High. In 1957 the school was renamed Gunston Junior High, named after Gunston Hall,  the home of George Mason, the estate is nearby in Fairfax County.

Gunston's mascot is the Hornet. The school colors are purple and teal. Sports teams include basketball, soccer, wrestling, swimming, track, and tennis.

Gunston's curriculum includes the continuation program for students who attended the Key Elementary or the Claremont Elementary Spanish Immersion program.  Students in this program take three classes each day taught entirely in Spanish: Science, Social Studies and Spanish Language Arts.  About 1/3 of the incoming 6th graders come from the Key or Claremont programs. Most people attending Gunston will attend Wakefield High School after graduating from 8th grade.

The school, at the time, called Gunston Junior High School and encompassing grades 7, 8, and 9, closed in 1978 after a major decline in enrollments. At the time of its closure, the school mascot was the Falcon, and the school colors were black and gold. Gunston reopened in 1994 to address overcrowding in other area schools. After the re-opening in 1994, it subsequently went through a 3-phase major renovation, funded by the 2000 bond package. Construction was completed in 2003. It was built as a two-story building with a public recreation center and public auditorium.

Source: Virginia Department of Education

Kenmore Middle School

Kenmore Middle School is located at 200 South Carlin Springs Road, in Glencarlyn. The principal is David McBride. In 2006–2007, there were 723 students enrolled and over 79 teachers (51 of which have their Master's Degree). It is accredited through the Southern Association of Colleges and Schools.

Kenmore's mascot is the Cougars. The school colors are green and gold.

Kenmore's building was completed for the 2005–2006 school year. The building contains a larger auditorium, cafeteria, art studio, and library/media center. It is multi-storied, unlike the previous building.  The previous building as an elementary school and later was a middle school. Most kids attending Kenmore will later on go to Wakefield or Washington-Liberty High School but in some cases will go to Yorktown.

Source: Virginia Department of Education

Swanson Middle School

Swanson Middle School is located at 5800 North Washington Boulevard.  The principal is Bridget Loft. In the 2019–2020 school year, there were 972 students enrolled and 98 teachers (8 of which have their Master's Degree.  It is accredited through the Southern Association of Colleges and Schools. Swanson was built in 1939 as part of a New Deal program and is the oldest surviving middle school in the county.

Swanson is home of the Admirals, though the school's namesake, Claude A. Swanson, was Secretary of the Navy, and never an "Admiral." They wear white and maroon.

In 1977, a student reportedly started a fire in the school as a prank, and ultimately burning the majority of the roof, including its cupola (a small dome-shaped structure crowning the roof). The student was expelled. Later that year, an unknown student or group of students repeatedly set off the fire alarms as a prank, costing Swanson hundreds of dollars in fines for abusing firemen's' time. It is unknown whether the student(s) were ever discovered or apprehended.

Swanson, in 2011–2012, decided to make three teams for each grade (they used to only have two per grade). For the 2016–17 school year, they have made four teams for sixth and seventh grade, as well as rename them.  Since the opening of Dorothy Hamm Middle School, they have returned to three teams per grade. For sixth grade, there are the Clippers, the Navigators, and the Schooners. For seventh grade there are the Narwhals, the Manatees, and the Orcas. For eighth grade there are the Cruisers, the Galleons, and the Frigates.  The names were voted on by Swanson students.

Swanson first opened its doors in 1940 as a 7th through 9th grade junior high to relieve crowding at nearby Washington-Lee High School. It is the oldest "junior high" in the state. Because of its unique contribution to education in Virginia as well as its Parisian architecture, inspired by the then recently restored Colonial Williamsburg, the school is pursuing its listing on the National Register of Historic Places. In recognition of the school's history, the Virginia State Legislature passed a resolution on Swanson's 50th anniversary in 1990 proclaiming Swanson as Virginia's first junior high school.

It was constructed with WPA funds on the site of the old Torreyson farm in the growing Westover community. One of two North Arlington junior highs targeted for closure in 1977 due to declining enrollment, Swanson reopened as an intermediate school the following year, and the 9th graders were transferred to W-L and Yorktown high schools. Stratford Junior High, although a newer facility, closed its doors. In the fall of 1990, Swanson once again housed three grades as a middle school. It has undergone several renovations, with the most recent in 2017.  

Source: Virginia Department of Education

Thomas Jefferson Middle School

Thomas Jefferson Middle School opened as a junior high school in 1938 and was named after the third president of the United States. The original cornerstone was placed with George Washington's trowel.  The current facility opened in 1971 and is located at 125 South Old Glebe Road in Arlington, Virginia 22204. It is built as a rectangle with three individual corridors for each grade. Upon entering the main entrance of the school, the administrative offices are to the left and the library is further down the long hall. Here, the three corridors extend themselves to another long hall in which various classrooms are located. Also, three individual staircases are located that lead students to a lower level where lockers are located in individual lobbies. The sixth grade lobby is green, the seventh grade lobby is yellow, and the eighth grade lobby is blue. The sixth and seven grade lobbies are also used as cafeteria seating with the kitchen in the middle. These two lobbies also have small corridors that lead to the school gymnasium. It was renovated in 2010. In September 2019 a new elementary school by the name of Alice Fleet opened right next to the old entrance to the school's lobby.

Jefferson was designed for use as not only a school but also for community recreation, with the second-largest gymnasium in the state and a community theater that can seat 715 people. The school district works with the local Division of Parks, Recreation and Community Resources to share the facilities.

The school's gymnasium is actually a part of the Thomas Jefferson Community Center. Indoors, a one-eighth mile track runs around four basketball courts and past athletic equipment. Outdoors, a half-mile bike trail runs around two athletic fields, two baseball diamonds, two basketball courts and four tennis courts. With the very large space, Arlington County uses the area for the annual Arlington County Fair every August. Most students attending TJ will go on to Wakefield High School but some will later go to Washington-Liberty High School.

Source: Virginia Department of Education

Williamsburg Middle School 

Williamsburg Middle School is located at 3600 North Harrison Street. The principal is Mr Brian Boykin
In 2007–2008, there were 1,282 students enrolled and over 77 teachers (66 of which have their Master's Degree). It is accredited through the Southern Association of Colleges and Schools.

The Williamsburg mascot is the "Wolves." An eighth grade student dresses up inside a wolf costume, and interacts with their peers during special events at the school. In the 2013–2014 school year, the students named their mascot William S. Burg. The school colors are white and blue.

There are three teams in each grade (three teams in eighth) along with a separate team (Rockets) for ESOL students. The 6th grade teams consist of the Panthers, Coyotes, and Grizzlies. The 7th grade teams are the Mystics, Capitols, and the Wizards; all based on Washington DC sports teams.  The 8th grade teams are based on college mascots in Virginia, and are Patriots, Cavaliers, and Hokies. Outside, there is one field currently, a baseball diamond, one tennis court and a blacktop with a basketball court and four square. There is a multi-usage weight room, an auxiliary gym and the main gym. In 2013, APS (Arlington Public Schools) started construction on a new elementary school on the WMS campus. The elementary school was named by a naming committee selected by the APS School Board, and is called Discovery Elementary School. Most kids attending Williamsburg will later on attend Yorktown High School.

Source: Virginia Department of Education

References

External links 
 Dorothy Hamm Middle School official site
 Gunston Middle School official site
 Kenmore Middle School official site
 Thomas Jefferson Middle School official site
 Great Schools page on Thomas Jefferson MS
 Swanson Middle School official site
 Williamsburg Middle School official site

Schools in Arlington County, Virginia
Public middle schools in Virginia
Universities and colleges accredited by the Southern Association of Colleges and Schools